The Escondido Formation is a geologic formation in Texas and Coahuila, Mexico. It preserves fossils dating back to the Late Cretaceous period.

See also

 List of fossiliferous stratigraphic units in Texas
 Paleontology in Texas

References

Cretaceous geology of Texas